Anne Marie Leggett (born May 28, 1947) is an American mathematical logician. She is an associate professor emerita of mathematics at Loyola University Chicago.

Leggett is the editor-in-chief of the bi-monthly newsletter of the Association for Women in Mathematics (AWM), a position she has held continuously since 1977. She has served on the Executive Committee of the AWM since 1977 and the AWM Policy and Advocacy Committee (2008-2015).  With Bettye Anne Case, she is the editor of the book Complexities: Women in Mathematics (with Anne M. Leggett, Princeton University Press, 2005).  Leggett received an Alpha Sigma Nu Book Award for Complexities in 2006.

Education and career
Leggett did her undergraduate studies at Ohio State University, and completed her Ph.D. in 1973 at Yale University. Her dissertation, Maximal -r.e. sets and their complements, was supervised by Manuel Lerman.

She became a C. L. E. Moore instructor at the Massachusetts Institute of Technology in 1973, and was also on the faculties of Western Illinois University and the University of Texas at Austin. In 1982, she married another mathematician, Gerard McDonald (1946–2012), and in 1983, they both joined the Loyola University Chicago faculty.

Recognition
Leggett was chosen to be part of the 2019 class of fellows of the Association for Women in Mathematics, "for extraordinary contributions in promoting opportunities for women in the mathematical sciences through AWM and as a teacher and scholar; for her amazing and steady work as editor of the AWM Newsletter since 1977; and for her invaluable leadership and guidance."

References

External links
Anne M. Leggett's Author Profile Page on MathSciNet

Living people
20th-century American mathematicians
21st-century American mathematicians
American women mathematicians
Mathematical logicians
Women logicians
Ohio State University alumni
Yale University alumni
Western Illinois University faculty
University of Texas at Austin faculty
Massachusetts Institute of Technology School of Science faculty
Loyola University Chicago faculty
Fellows of the Association for Women in Mathematics
20th-century women mathematicians
21st-century women mathematicians
1947 births
20th-century American women
21st-century American women